The Farmers' Lunch (Almuerzo de campesinos) is one of the earliest paintings by the Spanish artist Diego Velázquez. Painted in oil on canvas in 1617, it combines a still life of food and drink with a depiction of three comic farmers, whose physiognomy the artist studies closely. The composition shows a younger man gesturing with his right hand to reinforce the story coming from his half-open lips, and an older man listening attentively while holding his cup up to a woman so she can refill it with wine. The still life includes fish, bread, a carrot, a lemon, and a copper vessel.

The Farmers' Lunch is nearly identical to another painting by Velázquez, The Lunch (c. 1617).

1618 paintings
Seville-period paintings by Diego Velázquez
Paintings by Diego Velázquez
Paintings in the collection of the Museum of Fine Arts (Budapest)
Food and drink paintings
Genre paintings